Bir Moghrein is a city with 2,761 residents (Census 2000) in Tiris Zemmour region of northern Mauritania, close to the border with Western Sahara.

Climate

References

Populated places in Mauritania
Tiris Zemmour Region